The 1974  President's Cup Football Tournament was the fourth competition of Korea Cup. The competition was held from 11 to 20 May 1974, and was won by South Korea for the second time, who defeated PSMS Medan, representative of Indonesia in the final.

Group stage

Group A

Group B

Knockout stage

Bracket

Semi-finals

Third place play-off

Final

See also
Korea Cup
South Korea national football team results

External links
President Park's Cup 1974 (South Korea) at RSSSF

1974